Trapani (officially Libero consorzio comunale di Trapani) is a province in the autonomous island region of Sicily, southern Italy. Following the suppression of the Sicilian provinces, it was replaced in 2015 by the Free municipal consortium of Trapani. Its capital is the city of Trapani. There are 25 comunes (Italian: comuni) in the province (see Comuni of the Province of Trapani).

History
The area now covered by the province was occupied successively by the Carthaginians, Greeks and latterly by the Romans. The port of Trapani, first known as Drepana, then Drepanon, was inhabited by the Sicani and the Elymi becoming a prosperous Phoenician trading centre by the 8th century BC. It was taken by the Carthaginians in 260 BC and by the Romans in 240 BC, becoming a civitas romana until 440 AD when it was sacked by the Vandals, then by the Byzantines and ultimately by the Muslims in 830. In the 16th century, it received privileges under Emperor Charles V of Spain who also strengthened the town walls. Trapani became the provincial capital in 1817.

Geography
The province of Trapani borders the Tyrrhenian Sea to the north, the Mediterranean Sea to the south, and the Strait of Sicily to the west. It is bordered to the east with only the provinces of Palermo and Agrigento. The territory has few flat areas, although with the exception of the mountains of Sparagio (1,110 m) and Inici (1065 m), most land is under 1000 metres. The northwestern part is rugged in comparison to the south.  The province also includes the archipelago of the Egadi Islands belonging to the comune of Favignana, the island of Pantelleria which is  the largest of Sicily, in the comune of the same name, and the Stagnone Islands, which belong to the comune of Marsala. The Egadi Islands  consist of three main islands, Favignana, Levanzo and Marettimo and two islets, Formica and Maraone.

The province of Trapani has a number of rivers but most are not of notable size or importance, except for the Belice on the border of the province, and the Birgi, with a length of about 40 km. Other rivers include the torrential Modione, Mazaro, the  Fiume, the Salemi and the Sossius, the latter of which flows into the Mediterranean Sea at the resort of Berbaro.

Natural lakes include the Gorghi Tondi and Preola, in the comune of Mazara del Vallo, and the Lago di Venere  in Pantelleria. There are also three man-made lakes, Lago Rubino, created by a dam across the Cuddia River, which is part of the catchment area of the Birgi, at Lago Trinità in Castelvetrano, and the lake of the same name at the resort of Paceco. However, there is also a coastal lagoon, the Stagnone Lagoon, within a 2000 hectare reserve on the stretch of coast between Punta Alga and Cape San Teodoro, near Marsala, in an area which was once an important naval base and commercial for the Phoenicians. The waters are shallow and very salty, with marshland. The lagoon consists of four islands: Isola Longa Santa Maria, San Pantaleo and Schola.

Population
Here below are listed the Comuni with more than 10,000 inhabitants:
Marsala (82,456);
Trapani (67,141);
Mazara del Vallo (51,573);
Alcamo (45,406);
Castelvetrano (30,783);
Erice (27,046);
Castellammare del Golfo (15,072);
Valderice (11,852);
Campobello di Mazara (11,607);
Paceco (11,148);
Salemi (10,378);
Partanna (10,324).

The nearby island of Pantelleria, noted for its wine production, and the Aegadian Islands are also administratively a part of Trapani province.  The Province of Trapani is a major centre for viticulture.

Religion
 Maria Santissima della Confusione

References

External links 

  Official website 
 Pictures, history, tourism, gastronomy, books, local products, local surnames, transportation in the province of Trapani 

 
Trapani